Strine, also spelled Stryne , describes a broad accent of Australian English. The term is a syncope, derived from a shortened phonetic rendition of the pronunciation of the word "Australian" in an exaggerated Broad Australian accent, drawing upon the tendency of this accent to run syllables together in a form of liaison. 

The term was coined in 1964 when the accent was the subject of humorous columns published in the Sydney Morning Herald from the mid-1960s. Alastair Ardoch Morrison, under the Strine pseudonym of Afferbeck Lauder (a syncope for "Alphabetical Order"), wrote a song "With Air Chew" ("Without You") in 1965 followed by a series of books—Let Stalk Strine (1965), Nose Tone Unturned (1967), Fraffly Well Spoken (1968), and Fraffly Suite (1969). An example from one of the books: "Eye-level arch play devoisters ..." ("I'll have a large plate of oysters").

In 2009, Text Publishing, Melbourne, re-published all four books in an omnibus edition.

The late environmentalist and TV presenter Steve Irwin was once referred to as the person who "talked Strine like no other contemporary personality".

See also
 Diminutives in Australian English
 Monica Dickens
 How to Talk Australians, an online miniseries looking through the eyes of teachers and students at a fictional college

References

Citations

Sources 

 Lauder, Afferbeck (A. A. Morrison) Let Stalk Strine, Sydney, 1965, page 9
 Steber, David. Strine and Amusing Language from the Land Down Under, Steber & Associates, 1990. .

External links 

 With Air Chew—Copyright registration copy of the song in the National Archives of Australia
 Some examples of Strine (includes audio files)

Australian English
Australian humour
1960s neologisms